Room of Mirrors is the third album by the Italian jazz musician and composer Kekko Fornarelli. It was released in 2011 by AUAND records and distributed by Egea. Room of Mirrors is inspired by the Swedish musician Esbjorn Svensson.

Track listing

 Room of Mirrors
 Dailey Jungle
 The Flavour of Clouds
 Dreams and Compromise
 Children's Eyes
 Coffee and Cigarettes
 Time Goes On
 Night Lights

Personnel
 Kekko Fornarelli: piano, fender rhodes, synthesizer
 Luca Bulgarelli: double bass, electronics
 Gianlivio Liberti: drums, percussion.

Kekko Fornarelli albums